The Great Man is a 2000 Australian play by David Williamson about the death of a prominent Labor Party politician and its impact on people close to him.

References

Plays by David Williamson
2000 plays